Eastern Broadcasting Company (EBC), originally called Eastern Television (ETTV), is a nationwide cable television network in Taiwan that is operated by the Eastern Broadcasting Group, which also operates the online news site ETtoday. ETTV began channel syndications in the United States in 2003 under the name of ETTV America. As of 2007, Eastern Television has sister channels in South America (as ETTV South Central America) and the People's Republic of China (as ETTV China). In November 2015, Eastern Television renamed as Eastern Broadcasting Company.

EBC Channels
Eastern Broadcasting Company operates several channels:
EBC Variety
EBC News
EBC Financial News
EBC Drama
EBC Movie
EBC Foreign Movie
EBC Super TV
ETMall 1, 2, 3, 4, and 5
EBC Yoyo
EBC America
EBC Asia
EBC China
EBC Global

Defunct Channels
ETTV Entertainment
ET Today

Media Broadcasting in Singapore
 EBC Asia on Singtel TV Channels 13 (HD; Complimentary access) and 521 (HD; Jingxuan+)
 EBC Asia News on Singtel TV Channel 561

Media Broadcasting in Hong Kong and Macau
 EBC Asia on Cable TV Hong Kong on Channel 331
 EBC Asia News on Cable TV Hong Kong on Channel 114
 EBC Asia Yoyo TV on Cable TV Hong Kong On Channel 502 (Still available despite the channel went offline)
 EBC Asia on now TV on Channel 162
 EBC Asia News on now TV on Channel 371
 EBC Asia On Macau Cable TV Channel 22
 EBC Asia News on Macau Cable TV Channel 26

Media Broadcasting in the Philippines
EBC Foreign Movie on G Sat on Channel 16

See also
 List of Taiwanese television series

External links
 EBC
ETTV America
 ETTV Asia
 ETtoday (Traditional Chinese)

Television stations in Taiwan
Chinese-language television stations
Television channels and stations established in 1995